Mohammad Humayon Qayoumi (born December 14, 1952) is an engineer and professor who formerly served as acting Minister of Finance and as the Chief Adviser on Infrastructure and Technology to the President of Afghanistan. He previously served as President of San José State University where he was appointed on March 23, 2011. Prior to that, he served as the fourth president of California State University, East Bay. He has worked in university administration for more than 30 years and has a background in both engineering and business. Qayoumi was born in Afghanistan and is the first Afghan-American to head a major U.S. university.

In June 2010, Qayoumi contributed a photo essay to Foreign Policy magazine about Afghanistan in the 1960s, which led to an interview on the NPR program Morning Edition (aired June 18, 2010).

Personal and education background 
Born near Kabul, Afghanistan, Qayoumi earned a Bachelor of Science degree in electrical engineering from American University of Beirut in 1975. He holds four degrees from the University of Cincinnati: a Master of Science in nuclear engineering (1979), a Master of Science in electrical and computer engineering (1980), an MBA (1984), and a Ph.D. in electrical engineering (1983).

He was a tenured professor of engineering management at California State University, Northridge.

Career

Engineer
Before coming to the United States, Qayoumi worked as an engineer in Saudi Arabia and the United Arab Emirates. From 1979 to 1986, he held positions at the University of Cincinnati including staff engineer, director of technical services, and director of utilities and engineering services. In 1986, he took a position as associate vice president for Administration at San Jose State University. He served as vice chancellor for administrative services at University of Missouri-Rolla from 1995 to 2000. He then moved to California State University, Northridge, where he served as vice president for Administration and Finance and chief financial officer, as well as a tenured professor of engineering management until 2006. In 2004, Qayoumi's professional engineer registration expired.

President of Cal State East Bay 
Upon taking office at CSUEB in 2006, Qayoumi identified his top priorities as enrollment growth; improved financial stability and transparency; increasing tenure track faculty; and enhancing facilities and campus physical maintenance. He has overseen development of a new physical master plan for CSUEB's Hayward campus.

Under his leadership, the university adopted new long-range academic and strategic plans in 2008 with a focus on science, technology, engineering, and math (STEM) education and on modeling and teaching sustainability. In 2009, he announced the university's first comprehensive fundraising campaign to help underwrite this change in institutional emphasis while maintaining and increasing student access, particularly among underserved populations.

President of San Jose State University 
In March 2011, Qayoumi was appointed president of San Jose State University, effective July 1. Qayoumi's tenure as president has been marked by controversy for low faculty morale resulting from alleged lack of effective governance, explorations in alternate online education formats, and for his response to a racially motivated crime in the dormitory.

Qayoumi created a Special Task Force on Racial Discrimination in Spring 2014 and the President's Commission for Diversity in 2014–15.
He has also placed an emphasis on capital improvements to the campus.

On July 13, 2015, Qayoumi announced that he would resign on August 17 to take a position with the government of Afghanistan.

Notes

External links 

Mohammad Qayoumi Full curriculum vitae (PDF) 
CSUEB Web site
CSUEB Academic plan
CSUEB Strategic planning

1952 births
Living people
Afghan emigrants to the United States
Afghan engineers
American electrical engineers
American University of Beirut alumni
California State University, East Bay faculty
California State University, Northridge faculty
Finance Ministers of Afghanistan
People from Kabul
University of Cincinnati alumni
Presidents of San Jose State University
Engineers from California
Missouri University of Science and Technology faculty